The first world record in the 400 m for men (athletics) was recognized by the International Amateur Athletics Federation, now known as World Athletics, in 1912. The IAAF ratified Charles Reidpath's 48.2 performance set at that year's Stockholm Olympics as a world record, but it also recognized the superior mark over 440 yards (402.34 metres) run by Maxie Long in 1900 as a world record.

Through 2021, World Athletics has ratified 24 world records in the event.

The following tables show the world record progression in the men's 400 metres, as ratified by World Athletics.

Records 1912–1976

(+) plus sign denotes en route time during longer race
"y" denotes time for 440 yards, ratified as a record for this event
"A" indicates that the time was set at altitude.

The "Time" column indicates the ratified mark; the "Auto" column indicates a fully automatic time that was also recorded in the event when hand-timed marks were used for official records, or which was the basis for the official mark, rounded to the 10th of a second, depending on the rules then in place.

Records post-1976

From 1975, the IAAF accepted separate automatically electronically timed records for events up to 400 metres. Starting January 1, 1977, the IAAF required fully automatic timing to the hundredth of a second for these events.

Lee Evans' 1968 Olympic gold medal victory time of 43.86 was the fastest recorded result to that time.

References

Men's world athletics record progressions
World record men

Notes